The Roosevelt Inlet Shipwreck (7S-D-91A) is an 18th-century shipwreck in the waters of Delaware Bay near Lewes, Delaware.  The wreck was discovered during dredging operations near Roosevelt Inlet in 2004, and was examined by underwater archaeologists in 2006.  Analysis indicates that the ship was a commercial vessel that had probably come from Europe, and was wrecked sometime between 1772 and 1780.  More than 40,000 artifacts were recovered after the dredging operation scattered remains of the wreck on area beaches, and another 26,000 were recovered by the archaeological divers.  Only a small portion of the ship hull is intact, making further identification and analysis of the vessel difficult.

The site was listed on the National Register of Historic Places in 2006.

See also
National Register of Historic Places listings in Sussex County, Delaware

References

Archaeological sites on the National Register of Historic Places in Delaware
Shipwrecks on the National Register of Historic Places in Delaware
Buildings and structures in Lewes, Delaware
National Register of Historic Places in Sussex County, Delaware